Emily Kate Simpkins (born 25 May 1990) is an English footballer who plays as a midfielder for Charlton Athletic in the FA Women's Championship.

References

External links
 Doncaster Rovers Belles player profile 
 

Living people
English women's footballers
Women's association football midfielders
Women's association football defenders
1990 births
Sportspeople from Burton upon Trent
Women's Super League players
Birmingham City W.F.C. players
Doncaster Rovers Belles L.F.C. players
FA Women's National League players
Leicester City W.F.C. players
Nottingham Forest Women F.C. players
Brighton & Hove Albion W.F.C. players